The 2009 NFL season was the 90th season in the history of the National Football League (NFL). The 50th anniversary of the original eight charter members of the American Football League was celebrated during this season.

The preseason started with the Pro Football Hall of Fame Game on August 9, 2009, and the regular season began September 10, with the reigning Super Bowl XLIII champion Pittsburgh Steelers defeating the Tennessee Titans in overtime. The season ended with Super Bowl XLIV, the league's championship game, on February 7, 2010 at Sun Life Stadium with the New Orleans Saints defeating the Indianapolis Colts in Miami Gardens, Florida. The Colts and Saints began the season 14–0 and 13–0 respectively. This was the first time in NFL history two teams started 13–0 or better.

Draft
The 2009 NFL Draft was held from April 25 to 26, 2009 at New York City's Radio City Music Hall. With the first pick, the Detroit Lions selected quarterback Matthew Stafford from the University of Georgia.

Referee change
Bill Carollo resigned to become the Director of Officiating for the Big Ten Conference. Don Carey, brother of NFL referee Mike Carey, was promoted from back judge to take Carollo's place.

Rule changes
Several rule changes were passed at the league's annual owners meeting in Dana Point, California during the week of March 23.

The following rules were passed to improve player safety and reduce injuries:
A blindside block cannot be initially delivered by a helmet, forearm or shoulder to an opponent's head or neck.
The initial contact to the head of a defenseless receiver is also prohibited.
On kickoffs, a blocking wedge cannot consist of more than two players.
During onside kickoff attempts, the kicking team cannot have more than five players bunched together.
Clarified the 2006 rule about hitting passers below the knees; a defender on the ground cannot lunge or dive at or below the passer's knees. This is unofficially referred to as the "Tom Brady Rule", after Brady was injured at the Patriots' 2008 opening game against the Kansas City Chiefs, when Chiefs safety Bernard Pollard hit Brady below the knees, sidelining him for the rest of the 2008 season.

The replay system will now be allowed to cover the following situations:

Whether a loose ball from a passer is definitely a fumble or an incomplete pass. This was passed in response to a play in the San Diego Chargers–Denver Broncos Week 2 regular season game where, in the final minutes, referee Ed Hochuli ruled that Broncos quarterback Jay Cutler threw an incomplete pass. Replays clearly showed it was a fumble, but the play was previously not reviewable.
Whether a loose ball actually hit the sideline. This change was passed in response to a play in the NFC Championship Game between the Philadelphia Eagles and the Arizona Cardinals where a Cardinals kickoff was ruled to have gone out of bounds, but replays clearly showed it was recovered in bounds by Arizona.

Other new rules included:

 If onside kick does not go 10 yards, goes out of bounds, or is touched illegally at any time during the kick, the ball is immediately awarded to the receiving team. This amends a rule that was first implemented during the 2003 season. Previously, if the kicking team committed this foul before the final five minutes of the game, they had another chance to kick again from five yards back.
 On all fumbles and laterals that go out of bounds, the clock will immediately start when the referee signals ready for play instead of waiting until next snap.
 After the first pre-season game was played at the new Cowboys Stadium, with the Tennessee Titans' A. J. Trapasso's punt hitting the center-hung video display boards during the game, the league temporarily modified the rule regarding balls in play that strike an object such as a video board or a guy wire: in addition for the down being replayed, the game clock will also be reset to the time when the original play was snapped.
 In November the United States Congress held hearings regarding NFL players on the field receiving concussions and other major injuries. Strong recommendations were made to the commissioner, and on December 2, 2009 NFL Commissioner Roger Goodell issued a memo effective immediately stating, in part: "Once removed for the duration of a practice or game, the player should not be considered for return-to-football activities until he is fully asymptotic, both at rest and after exertion, has a normal neurological examination, normal neuropsychological testing, and has been cleared to return by both his team physician(s) and the independent neurological consultant." The old standard, established in 2007, said a player shouldn't be allowed to return to the same game if he lost consciousness.

Preseason
The Pro Football Hall of Fame Game was on August 9, 2009 at 8:00 pm EDT on NBC. The Tennessee Titans defeated the Buffalo Bills 21–18, and both wore "throwback" jerseys celebrating the two franchises' AFL origins. It was the first time since 1970 that the teams have not been from opposing conferences; also, both Bills owner Ralph Wilson, a 2009 Hall of Fame inductee, and Titans owner Bud Adams have owned their teams continuously since the AFL's inception in 1960, making them the longest-tenured team owners in the league.

The rest of the pre-season matchups were announced March 30, 2009. Highlights, among others, included a rematch of Super Bowl XLIII between the Pittsburgh Steelers and the Arizona Cardinals on ESPN.

Regular season
The 2009 season began on September 10, 2009. Under the current scheduling system, this is the latest date the NFL can start its season as the season typically starts the weekend after Labor Day, which falls on its latest possible date in 2009.

For the 2009 season, the intraconference and interconference matchups were:

Intraconference
AFC East vs. AFC South
AFC North vs. AFC West
NFC East vs. NFC South
NFC North vs. NFC West

Interconference
AFC East vs. NFC South
AFC North vs. NFC North
AFC South vs. NFC West
AFC West vs. NFC East

The 2009 schedule was released on April 14, 2009. Highlights of the 2009 season included:

 NFL Kickoff Game: The 2009 season began with the Kickoff Game on September 10, with the Super Bowl XLIII champion Pittsburgh defeating the Tennessee 13–10.
 The Week 1 doubleheader for Monday Night Football honored the 50th anniversary of the original eight charter members of the American Football League, with the New England defeating the Buffalo 25–24, and the San Diego defeating the Oakland 24–20.
 NFL International Series: The NFL International Series game was played on October 26, 2009 at Wembley Stadium in London, featuring the New England defeating the Tampa Bay 35–7.
 Thanksgiving: Three games were contested on November 26, 2009. The Green Bay defeated the Detroit 34–12, the Dallas defeated the Oakland 24–7, while in the primetime Thursday Night Football game, the Denver defeated the New York Giants 26–6..
 Bills Toronto Series: The Buffalo Bills played the New York Jets at Rogers Centre in Toronto on December 3 on Thursday Night Football, with the Jets defeating the cross-state rivals 19–13. Earlier reports on a potential Bills-Toronto Argonauts doubleheader and reports of the league favoring other teams were proven inaccurate.
 Christmas: As Christmas Eve fell on a Thursday, that week's Thursday Night Football game was scheduled as a rare Friday night game on Christmas Day, featuring the San Diego defeating the Tennessee 42–17.

Scheduling changes
China Bowl: The China Bowl, a proposed pre-season game between the New England and Seattle, would have taken place in Beijing, China. It had been postponed from the 2007 season to 2009, but after the 2008 economic crisis, the Patriots closed their Chinese operations and the game was cancelled.
 The NFL moved the September 27 game between the Tennessee and New York Jets at Giants Stadium from 4:15 pm EDT to 1:00 pm EDT, in response to a request from Jets owner Woody Johnson to change the time to accommodate the Jewish Yom Kippur holiday that began at sundown that evening. This marked a rare occasion when the Jets and Giants played at the same time (the Giants played at Tampa Bay). In general, both New York City teams are not scheduled to play at the same time. The Jets game aired on CBS (WCBS-TV in New York), while the Giants game aired on Fox (WNYW-TV).
The Jets and Giants played again at the same time on November 1. The Jets hosted the Miami Dolphins at Giants Stadium, while the Giants played at Philadelphia. The Giants–Eagles game was originally scheduled for 4:15 pm EST, but moved forward to 1:00 pm EST in order to avoid ending too close to the start of the Phillies hosting Game 4 of the 2009 World Series that evening at Citizens Bank Park, which is directly across Pattison Avenue from Lincoln Financial Field. The Minnesota–Green Bay game, originally scheduled for 1:00 pm EST that same day, was moved to 4:15 pm EST.
 The Chicago–Minnesota and Arizona–Tennessee games on November 29 were rescheduled from 1:00 pm EST to 4:15 pm EST.
 By way of Flex Scheduling, the Minnesota–Arizona game on December 6 was moved to the 8:20 pm EST slot to replace the Patriots–Dolphins matchup.
 The St. Louis–Tennessee game on December 13 was rescheduled from 1:00 pm EST to 4:05 pm EST.
 The Green Bay–Pittsburgh game on December 20 was rescheduled from 1:00 pm EST to 4:15 pm EST. That same day, a major east coast blizzard forced the Chicago–Baltimore and San Francisco–Philadelphia games to be pushed back from 1:00 pm EST to 4:15 pm EST on only two days notice, to allow more time for cleaning up the stadiums after the blizzard.
 The Denver–Philadelphia game on December 27 was moved from 1:00 pm EST to 4:15 pm EST.
 For week 17, the Philadelphia–Dallas game was switched to 4:15 pm EST, while the Cincinnati–New York Jets game was selected as the final Sunday Night Football game.

Regular season standings

Division

Conference

Postseason

The playoffs began Saturday, January 9, 2010 with Wild Card Weekend. Divisional playoffs followed the next week. The defending world champions Pittsburgh Steelers did not take part in the post-season as they were eliminated from contention in the final week 17, thus this was the fifth year in a row the NFL crowned a new Super Bowl champion.

The AFC Championship Game was Sunday, January 24, 2010 at 3:00 pm, which saw the Indianapolis Colts come from behind to defeat the New York Jets, 30–17. It was followed by the NFC Championship Game at 6:30 pm which featured many back to back scoring drives by two high scoring Vikings and Saints offenses. But the Minnesota Vikings 4 fumbles and a Brett Favre interception late in the fourth quarter proved to be too much to handle as the New Orleans Saints won 31–28 in overtime which granted the franchise's first Super Bowl appearance in its 43-year history. Super Bowl XLIV was held February 7 at Miami Gardens, Florida's Sun Life Stadium (home of host team Miami Dolphins, who were also eliminated from post-season contention).

The 2010 Pro Bowl was held on January 31, one week before Super Bowl XLIV, at the same site of the league championship game, Sun Life Stadium in Miami Gardens, Florida. This was the first time since 1979 (held for the  season) that the Pro Bowl was held in the Continental United States as opposed to Hawaii. The NFL also announced that the site and date of Pro Bowl games after 2010 will include playing the game on a rotating basis in Honolulu. NFL Commissioner Roger Goodell said the move was made after looking at alternatives to strengthen the Pro Bowl and to make the end of the season more climactic. As a result of the move, players will not be allowed to play in both the Super Bowl and the Pro Bowl in the same year. In addition, ESPN replaced CBS as broadcaster for that game only.

Playoffs bracket

Fiftieth anniversary of the American Football League

The 2009 season marked the fiftieth season of nine of the league's 32 teams: the Dallas Cowboys, and the Original Eight charter members of the American Football League, whose owners became collectively known as "The Foolish Club."  The fifth league to use the AFL moniker (previous leagues in 1926, 1934, 1936–37, and 1940–41, all had failed) began play in 1960 and would form the major portion of the American Football Conference (AFC) when the NFL completed its merger with the AFL in :

Boston Patriots, now the New England Patriots
Buffalo Bills
Dallas Texans, now the Kansas City Chiefs
Denver Broncos
Houston Oilers, now the Tennessee Titans
San Diego Chargers, now the Los Angeles Chargers
Titans of New York, now the New York Jets
Oakland Raiders (Originally a Minnesota team, then the botched-Spanglish Oakland Senors, before settling on Raiders prior to first game)

The Bills and Jets used AFL-era throwback uniforms as their alternate jerseys prior to 2009, and continued them beyond that. The league had the other six teams use a third jersey replicating those from the AFL in their heyday. Each of the Original Eight played against another original AFL team, one at home and one away, on two "AFL Legacy Weekends", and had a special 50th Anniversary AFL patch on the throwback uniforms. In a waiver given by these eight, they would wear the anniversary throwbacks a maximum of four times a season, whereas all of the other teams have a limit of twice per season. The Patriots and Raiders wore the throwbacks the maximum four times, while the Bills, Chiefs (Texans), Chargers, Jets (Titans), and Titans (Oilers) were worn three times. The Chargers also wore their regular powder blue alternate jersey of the current design for two other allowed games. In the second game of two meetings opposite of the first game for their divisional matches against the Raiders and Chiefs, the Chargers wore their newer look powder blue jerseys against the Raiders in week 8, and also celebrated their 50th Anniversary in the modern powder blue jerseys against the Chiefs later in the season during Week 12, when the meeting against those two clubs shifted to San Diego. The Broncos elected to wear their throwbacks only twice (the team wore the infamous 1960–1961 brown and yellow throwbacks with the vertically-striped socks) and wore their regular orange alternate jersey of the current design in the other two allowed games, giving the team six different uniforms over a 16-game season. Both of the games involving the orange jerseys involved the Dallas Cowboys and the Pittsburgh Steelers—two "old" NFL teams before the merger, with the Steelers joining the Broncos in the AFC in 1970 as a result of the merger.

An AFL patch is already a permanent part of the Kansas City Chiefs' jerseys, in honor of team and AFL founder Lamar Hunt, who died in December 2006. The program kicked off on August 9 in the 2009 Pro Football Hall of Fame Game with the Bills playing the Titans (Oilers). Besides the Legacy Games, the Chiefs wore Dallas Texans uniforms in one home game against the NFC's Dallas Cowboys, who also wore throwbacks, while the Cowboys hosted the Raiders in a Thanksgiving Day game in Arlington, Texas. (The Chiefs and Cowboys throwbacks both feature team-colored jerseys, making it the first dark color vs. dark color game since the Bears-Cowboys 2004 Thanksgiving game.) For all games other than those cited above, the Original Eight wore their 2009 uniforms, each with a team-specific 50th Anniversary shoulder patch, save for the Titans, who wore the AFL 50th Anniversary logo on all uniforms. For the legacy weekends, on-field officials working the Original Eight's games also had their own throwbacks – shirts with Chinese-red stripes, and an AFL chest and cap logo. The fields for the regular season games were painted in the innovative designs introduced by the AFL in the 1960s (for instance, the Broncos' end zones are painted in an argyle pattern).

Although the Dolphins and Bengals were both part of the AFL, they did not join the league until 1966 and 1968, respectively. The Dolphins played in three of the Legacy games (wearing their current uniforms), while the Bengals were not part of the events.

After the season, the Patriots adopted their AFL-era throwbacks as their new third uniform for 2010, while the Broncos continue to paint their end zones at Invesco Field at Mile High in the argyle pattern, similar to the Steelers decision to paint the south end zone at Heinz Field in plain diagonal white lines after their 2003 preseason game against the Philadelphia Eagles honoring the 60th anniversary of the Steagles season.

Other anniversaries
It was the fortieth season since the AFL–NFL merger was officially completed in 1970, and also the sixtieth season since the All-America Football Conference merged with the NFL, adding the Cleveland Browns and San Francisco 49ers to the league. No celebrations were held for any of those teams, but San Francisco reverted to their old colors (lighter shades of red and gold from their glory seasons of five Super Bowl victories) in an unrelated move.

Dallas Cowboys
The NFC's Dallas Cowboys also celebrated their fiftieth season in 2009. After the NFL had rebuffed Lamar Hunt's overtures to place an NFL team in Dallas, saying they had no plans to expand, the league granted the Cowboys a franchise in 1960 in reaction to Hunt's AFL Dallas Texans. Ironically, the Texans' franchise, which left Dallas to become the Kansas City Chiefs, won Super Bowl IV, two years before the Cowboys won their first. Though there was never an actual game between the Dallas Texans and the Cowboys, the 2009 "throwback" game played against Kansas City (Dallas Texans) and the Dallas Cowboys was played as "The Game that Never Was." The [Dallas] Cowboys won the game at Arrowhead Stadium in Kansas City, Missouri, 26–20 in overtime. Interestingly, the visiting Cowboys wore home throwback jerseys, so both teams wore home uniforms.

NFC North
All four members of the NFC North celebrated significant anniversaries.

The Green Bay Packers and Chicago Bears, two of the oldest teams of the NFL remaining in the league, marked their 90th seasons in 2009. While the Packers did not join the NFL until 1921, the team marks its founding with the team's creation in 1919. The first Sunday Night Football game of the season featured the two teams, pitted in "The League's Oldest Rivalry."

Likewise, the Minnesota Vikings celebrated their being in existence for 50 years. The team traces its existence to the founding of the AFL in 1959, but although they participated in that league's inaugural draft, they were instead lured to the NFL before playing a game. (The Oakland Raiders replaced Minnesota in the AFL.) The Minnesota team, not named the Vikings until after they joined the NFL and did not take any of their drafted players with them, were granted their own expansion draft by the NFL and did not play until 1961. Last season, Detroit reintroduced its throwback jersey, while Minnesota continues using theirs. None of the teams held significant celebrations in 2009.

Notable events

Return of Brett Favre 
After one season with the New York Jets, Brett Favre retired again from football on February 11, 2009 and was released on April 28, 2009, making him a free agent. On May 4, 2009, rumors began nationwide on the Internet, radio and TV outlets about him coming out of retirement again and possibly joining the Minnesota Vikings, his division arch-rival when he was with the Green Bay Packers, also meeting with Vikings head coach Brad Childress that week. On May 11, in an indication of Favre's possible return, it was reported he was scheduled to have a procedure on his torn biceps tendon on his throwing arm he injured when he was with the Jets and it was either a surgical or non-surgical process but wasn't confirmed throughout May. On June 15, 2009, he revealed he had surgery on his right torn biceps tendon and considered on playing again. On July 15, 2009, he informed the Vikings that he would make his decision of coming out of retirement or not by July 30, 2009, the day Vikings training camp started. On July 28, 2009, two days early before training camp, he informed the Vikings that he would remain retired. On August 18, 2009, it was reported that Favre got on a private jet and was heading to Minnesota to join the Vikings. It was later confirmed and he officially signed with the Minnesota Vikings. He was signed to a two-year, $25 million deal with an option for 2010 for $13 million. On December 6, 2009, Favre played in his 283rd consecutive game, breaking Jim Marshall's long-standing record. The Vikings finished their season with a record of 12–4 and made the playoffs as the number two seed. Favre was voted to the 2010 Pro Bowl, but did not participate and was replaced by Tony Romo.

Return of Michael Vick
Free agent quarterback Michael Vick was reinstated on July 27, 2009 after finishing his 2-year prison term and on August 13, 2009, he signed a one-year, $1.6 million contract with the Philadelphia Eagles also with an option in 2010 for 5 million. Vick finished the season with one passing touchdown and two rushing touchdowns. He helped the Eagles to an 11–5 record and the NFC's number six seed.

Jay Cutler trade
After disagreements between Jay Cutler and the Denver Broncos management, on March 15, 2009, Cutler requested a trade from the team. On April 2, 2009, Cutler was traded to the Chicago Bears from the Broncos along with a fifth-round pick in the 2009 NFL Draft. In return, the Broncos acquired quarterback Kyle Orton along with the Bears' first and third-round selections in 2009 also the first round pick in 2010. Later in the season on October 20, 2009, the Bears signed Cutler to a two-year, $30 million contract extension up to 2013.

Two teams undefeated late into the season
The Indianapolis Colts started the season 14–0, and the New Orleans Saints started the season 13–0, the first time that two teams went that deep into the season without suffering a loss. Unlike the Saints who had not yet clinched home field throughout the playoffs and who legitimately lost their fourteenth game in Week 15, the Colts intentionally lost their fifteenth game in Week 16, giving an opportunity to the Jets to get into the playoffs.  After setting the record for consecutive regular season wins over multiple seasons, running their mark to 23, the Colts were up at halftime at home, and then Coach Caldwell benched all his starters for the second half, allowing the Jets to win, and ruining the Colts' try at a perfect season.  Indianapolis fans were incensed and heartily booed Caldwell.

Incidents with Tom Cable
On August 17, 2009 Oakland Raiders head coach Tom Cable was accused of punching assistant coach Randy Hanson in the face and fracturing his jaw. The incident allegedly took place on August 5 during the Raiders training camp, held in Napa. On October 22, 2009, the Napa district attorney announced that no charges would be filed against Cable. The Raiders finished their season with a record of 5–11.

Death of Chris Henry
Cincinnati Bengals wide receiver Chris Henry died on December 17, 2009. He was placed on the injured reserved list four weeks before the accident. He suffered from injuries after falling from the back of his pick-up truck in Charlotte, North Carolina the previous day.

Death of Gaines Adams
Chicago Bears defensive end Gaines Adams died on January 17, 2010, a few weeks after the Bears season had ended. He died in Greenwood, South Carolina from cardiac arrest caused by an enlarged heart.

First Super Bowl appearance for Saints
On January 24, 2010, the New Orleans Saints defeated the Minnesota Vikings in the NFC Championship Game in overtime by a score of 31–28. The win secured their berth in Super Bowl XLIV, the franchise's first ever Super Bowl.

Later on February 7, the Saints defeated the Indianapolis Colts in the Super Bowl by a score of 31–17. Quarterback Drew Brees was named the MVP.

Records and milestones

Winning and losing streaks
The Atlanta Falcons accomplished their first back to back winning seasons in franchise history. They still hold the record among all major American sports leagues for the longest streak of seasons without consecutive winning seasons. The streak lasted for 43 years from 1966.
The New Orleans Saints won their first 13 games in the NFC of the regular season, breaking the record of 12 straight by the 1985 Chicago Bears who also won the Super Bowl.
The Indianapolis Colts won their 23rd consecutive regular season game with a 35–31 victory over the Jacksonville Jaguars on December 16, 2009. The previous week, the Colts had broken the previous record (21-games) held by the 2003–2004 New England Patriots. They lost the following week to the New York Jets after resting many of their starters with a 15–10 lead in the third quarter of that game.
The Denver Broncos became the third team since 1970 to miss the NFL playoffs after a 6–0 start. The other two teams to miss the playoffs since the AFL/NFL merger were the 1978 Washington Redskins and the 2003 Minnesota Vikings.
The Tennessee Titans started the season losing their first six games, then, led by second-string quarterback Vince Young, won their next five games, the first NFL team to have such a turnaround.
The Pittsburgh Steelers became the first team since the 1987 New York Giants to lose five consecutive games in the season after winning the Super Bowl.
Two teams tied an NFL record for most kickoff returns for touchdowns in a single game, with two: the Miami Dolphins (November 1, vs. the New York Jets) and the Cleveland Browns (December 20, vs. the Kansas City Chiefs).

Rams achieve worst peacetime three-season streak until mid-2010s Browns
Since a regular schedule began in 1936, only two teams have achieved a comparably bad record over three seasons:
the 2015 to 2017 Cleveland Browns, who went 4–44 over three seasons

First team to go to the Super Bowl with a losing streak
The New Orleans Saints became the first team in NFL history to lose their last three regular season games and then go on to the Super Bowl and win.

Two top seeds face each other in Super Bowl
For the first time since the 1993 season, the AFC's and NFC's top seeds, the Indianapolis Colts and the New Orleans Saints respectively, played one another in the Super Bowl, where the Saints defeated the Colts, 31–17.

Tom Brady's record-setting quarter
In a Week 6 game against the Tennessee Titans, the New England Patriots' Tom Brady threw five touchdown passes in the second quarter, an NFL record. The Patriots led the Titans 45–0 at halftime, also a league record, before winning the game 59–0, tied for the league's largest shutout margin since the 1970 AFL–NFL merger.

Panthers produce two 1,100+ yard rushers

DeAngelo Williams and Jonathan Stewart of the Carolina Panthers became the first teammates in NFL history to rush for 1,100 yards in the same season. Williams rushed for 1,117 yards, and Stewart ran for 1,133 yards.

Kurt Warner sets single-game regular-season completion percentage record
In Week 2, the Arizona Cardinals' Kurt Warner set a new NFL record for completion percentage, completing 92.3% of his passes (24 completions in 26 attempts) in a 31–17 win over the Jacksonville Jaguars. The previous record had been set by Vinny Testaverde in 1993. If postseason games are included, the record holder is Tom Brady of the New England Patriots, who completed 26 of 28 attempts on January 12, 2008, also against the Jaguars.

Brandon Marshall breaks single-game reception record
In Week 13, the Denver Broncos' Brandon Marshall caught a record 21 catches in a losing effort against the Indianapolis Colts. (The record was previously held by the San Francisco 49ers' Terrell Owens, who had 20 catches in a 2001 game.)

Aaron Rodgers strong start
Aaron Rodgers of the Green Bay Packers became the first quarterback to throw for 4,000 yards in each of his first two seasons as a starter. (Rodgers, Cam Newton of the Carolina Panthers, Andrew Luck of the Indianapolis Colts, and Kurt Warner of the St. Louis Rams are the only quarterbacks to throw for 4,000 in their first season as a starter. Warner, however, passed for only 3,429 in 2000. Rodgers passed for 4,038 in 2008 and 4,434 in 2009.)

2,000-yard season for Chris Johnson
On January 3, 2010, Chris Johnson of the Tennessee Titans became the sixth rusher in NFL history to eclipse 2,000 rushing yards in a season. Johnson also broke the all-purpose yards from scrimmage record previously held by Marshall Faulk.

Joshua Cribbs breaks NFL's career returns record
In a Week 15 game against the Kansas City Chiefs on December 20, 2009, the Cleveland Browns' Joshua Cribbs returned two kickoffs for touchdowns, giving him eight for his career, and setting a new league record. Cribbs also became one of only two players to score two 100-plus yard touchdowns in the same game. (The feat was first accomplished by Ted Ginn Jr. of the Miami Dolphins in Week 8 of the 2009 season.)

Cowboys set single-game attendance record
For the opening game of their new stadium, the Dallas Cowboys distributed 105,121 tickets, setting an NFL record for attendance in a single game. The old mark of 103,467 occurred in October 2005 at a 49ers-Cardinals game at Azteca Stadium in Mexico.

Drew Brees sets season completion percentage record
Drew Brees of the New Orleans Saints set an NFL record for completion percentage in a season. Brees was 363 of 514, a completion percentage of 70.6. (The record of 70.55% had previously been set in the strike-shortened 1982 season by Ken Anderson of the Cincinnati Bengals. Brees sat out the last game of the 2009 season since New Orleans had secured home-field advantage throughout the NFC Playoffs.)

Highest scoring playoff game in NFL history
On January 10, 2010, the Arizona Cardinals defeated the Green Bay Packers 51–45 for a combined total of 96 points, setting a new NFL playoff record for total combined points scored.  This game has been given the nicknames "The Shootout", and the "Nobody Stopping Nobody Game".

Conference championships become most viewed playoff games in history
On January 24, 2010, the NFC and AFC championship games averaged 52.9 million viewers, making it the most-viewed conference championship day since the two games in 1982 averaged 60.2 million viewers. Fox's telecast of the Saints' 31–28 overtime win over the Vikings earned a 30.6 fast-national Nielsen rating (57.9 million viewers), marking Fox's biggest audience ever for an NFC championship game. It was also the second largest all-time audience for any conference title telecast, trailing only the 1982 49ers-Cowboys game (68.7 million viewers on CBS).

Excluding Super Bowl telecasts, the Saints-Vikings game was the most-viewed television program since the "Seinfeld" finale in 1998. Meanwhile, CBS earned a 26.3 fast-national rating (46.9 million viewers) for the Colts–Jets AFC championship game in the early window, marking the largest audience for an AFC title game since NBC earned 47.5 million viewers for Patriots–Dolphins in 1986.

Super Bowl becomes most viewed program in history
Super Bowl XLIV surpassed the 1983 finale of M*A*S*H, as the most viewed program in history. It was watched by 153.4 million people. Compelling story lines included the city of New Orleans and its ongoing recovery from Hurricane Katrina, as well as Colts quarterback Peyton Manning's attempt at a second Super Bowl ring.

Regular season statistical leaders

Awards

Postseason awards

Team superlatives

Offense
Most points scored: New Orleans, 510
Fewest points scored: St. Louis, 175
Most total offensive yards: New Orleans, 6,461
Fewest total offensive yards: Cleveland, 4,163 
Most total passing yards: Houston, 4,654
Fewest total passing yards: Cleveland, 2,076
Most rushing yards: New York Jets, 2,756
Fewest rushing yards: Indianapolis, 1,294

Defense
Fewest points allowed: New York Jets, 236
Most points allowed: Detroit, 494
Most total yards allowed: Detroit, 6,274
Fewest total yards allowed: New York Jets, 4,037
Fewest passing yards allowed: New York Jets, 2,459
Most passing yards allowed: Detroit, 4,249
Fewest rushing yards allowed: Green Bay, 1,333
Most rushing yards allowed: Tampa Bay, 2,531

All-Pro team

The following players were named first team All-Pro by the Associated Press:

Players of the Week
The following were the players of the week during the 2009 season:

AFC

NFC

Players of the Month
The following were the players of the month during the 2009 season:

AFC

NFC

Rookies
The following are the rookies of the month during the 2009 season:

Coaching changes

Pre-season
Eight teams hired new head coaches prior to the start of the 2009 season, while two made their interim coaches permanent, and another moved from one team to another after being fired by a team:

In-season
The following coaches were fired during the 2009 season:

Stadium changes
The 2009 season was the first season for the new Cowboys Stadium in Arlington, replacing Texas Stadium in Irving.

Dolphin Stadium was renamed Land Shark Stadium after a naming rights deal was signed with the Land Shark beer that was sold Jimmy Buffett's Margaritaville restaurant chain.

This season also served as the last season for Giants Stadium, as both the New York Giants and Jets moved into a new stadium for 2010. The Giants exited with an auspicious 41–9 loss to Carolina on December 27, while the Jets defeated the Cincinnati Bengals by a 37–0 score in the season finale on Sunday night, January 3, 2010.

Uniforms
After having no major uniform changes for the 2008 NFL season, the trend of at least one major uniform change per season among the 32 teams returned with two major uniform changes, as well as one with some minor modifications.

The San Francisco 49ers, who had been long-rumored to be returning to their 1964–1995 uniforms (and have had the red variation of those uniforms as their third uniform since the 2002 season) did so for this season. The team returned to a brighter, scarlet red and a less metallic "49ers gold" as its team colors, replacing the darker cardinal red and the more metallic "49ers gold" which the team has worn since it last overhauled their uniforms in 1996. The new uniforms were unveiled on April 25, 2009.

The Jacksonville Jaguars got new uniforms for the 2009 season. Team owner Wayne Weaver reportedly wanted to "clean up" the look, feeling that the team has too many uniform styles. The changes aren't a complete overhaul, but similar to the Atlanta Falcons and Minnesota Vikings' recent overhauls. The new uniforms were introduced at a press conference on April 22.

The Detroit Lions designated their popular 1950s-era throwbacks as their third uniform and completely dropped their unpopular black jerseys. The team had not worn the throwbacks from 2005–07 to make room for the Matt Millen-designated black jerseys. In addition, the team unveiled a new helmet logo on April 20, updating "Bubbles" with a fiercer look and wordmark, with modified uniforms. Those logos were accidentally leaked by NFL.com in their online shop, then quickly removed on March 23, 2009.

Besides the above-mentioned throwbacks for the 50th anniversary season of the AFL, the Tampa Bay Buccaneers wore their "Creamsicle" throwbacks for the November 8 home game against the Green Bay Packers, in conjunction with the creation of the Buccaneers Ring of Honor. The Buccaneers defeated the Packers 38–28, the only home game the team won in 2009.

The St. Louis Rams wore their 1973–1999 blue uniforms in select home games to honor former owner Georgia Frontiere, who died in early 2008 (too late to inform the NFL about wearing a throwback uniform in her honor during the 2008 season; the team instead opted for a memorial patch) and also celebrate the tenth anniversary of their win in Super Bowl XXXIV. Ironically, the Rams cut ties with its last two remaining offensive players from the "Greatest Show on Turf" era during the offseason by releasing Orlando Pace and Torry Holt for salary cap reasons plus opting for a rebuilding mode after a 2–14 season in 2008 (second only to the Lions' historic 0–16 season) and no trips to the postseason since the 2004 season. Defensive end Leonard Little is the only player remaining who wore the pre-2000 uniforms again in 2009. These uniforms were worn on October 11 against the Vikings and December 20 against the Texans.

The Cleveland Browns, Dallas Cowboys, Minnesota Vikings, and Pittsburgh Steelers retained their throwback alternates worn in previous seasons. The Tennessee Titans wore a Number 9 decal on the back of their helmets to honor former Titans quarterback Steve McNair, who was killed on July 4, while the Philadelphia Eagles wore a decal with the initials of Jim Johnson, their longtime defensive coordinator who died on July 28. The Seattle Seahawks also unveiled a lime green jersey with blue shoulders, to pay tribute to the new Major League Soccer team with whom they share Qwest Field. The jersey No. 71 was retired for former offensive lineman Walter Jones on December 9, 2009.

The Miami Dolphins, after a four-year hiatus, brought back their alternate orange jerseys and wore them against the New York Jets on October 12.

Media

Television

This was the fourth season under the television contracts with the league's television partners: CBS (all AFC Sunday afternoon away games and one Thanksgiving game), Fox (all NFC Sunday afternoon away games and one Thanksgiving game), NBC (16 Sunday night games and the kickoff game), ESPN (17 Monday night games over sixteen weeks), NFL Network (eight late-season games on Thursday and Saturday nights, including one Thanksgiving game and a Christmas night game), and DirecTV's NFL Sunday Ticket package. These agreements with CBS, Fox and DirecTV were extended two years through the 2013 season on May 19, 2009, and NBC's contract was also extended through that same season on August 19 of the same year; these extensions were done so they all coincided with the 2013 expiration date on ESPN's contract.

CBS celebrated their 50th season of NFL coverage; CBS has covered NFL games from 1956 to 1993 and again from 1998 to the present. Ironically, CBS which was ordered by the NFL not to give American Football League scores during its NFL broadcasts of the 1960s, now covers the AFC, while Fox covers the NFC. This season was also the fortieth consecutive season that Monday Night Football has been a permanent part of the NFL schedule, though the league had played games on Monday night sporadically before this. Monday Night Football originally aired on ABC before switching to ESPN in 2006, when the two networks' sports operations were merged. The first Monday night of the regular season featured two AFL Original Eight games, a doubleheader with the Bills at the Patriots and the Chargers at the Raiders.

NFL Network continued to have coverage disputes with major cable providers. In particular, Comcast, the largest cable provider in the United States, was considering removing the network from its lineups on April 30, 2009, shortly after the draft but before the start of the preseason. Comcast was carrying the network on a digital sports tier and negotiations continued past the April 30 deadline as NFLN would continue on Comcast, which ended with a resolution on May 19 that could open the door for other major cable providers such as Cablevision and Cox to carry the network on a what would be equal to Comcast's digital classic tier, with around 10 million subscribers. However, the most notable holdout, Time Warner Cable, still is nowhere near a deal. Additionally, the NFL Network created a new "Red Zone Channel" starting with the season openers September 13. Comcast-owned Versus has signed a deal to carry United Football League games on Thursday nights; the tail end of the UFL schedule overlapped with the first few weeks of the Thursday night NFL package. In related news, the NFL has reached a settlement with DISH Network over the satellite provider's decision to move NFL Network to a higher tier. NFL Network has also dropped the use of the names "Run to the Playoffs" and "Saturday Night Football", opting to standardize all of its broadcasts under the "Thursday Night Football" banner. The Saturday night and Friday night games airing on the network was marketed as "Thursday Night Football Special Edition."

This was also the first NFL season after the DTV transition in the United States, which had originally been scheduled to take place on February 17, 2009 but was delayed until June 12, 2009. Hawaii made the digital switchover on January 15, 2009. (Low-power translators will still be allowed to broadcast in analog until at least 2012, and cable providers will continue to distribute analog signals for the foreseeable future.)

After fifty seasons as a player, coach, broadcaster and video game maven, John Madden retired on April 16 from his position on Sunday Night Football. Cris Collinsworth moved from NFL Network to NBC to assume Madden's in-game analyst role with Al Michaels; Matt Millen replaced Collinsworth on NFL Network, while Tony Dungy and Rodney Harrison replaced Collinsworth and Jerome Bettis as studio analysts on NBC's Football Night in America pregame show. In addition, Tony Kornheiser left MNF and former Raiders and Buccaneers coach Jon Gruden replaced him.

Radio
In radio, it was reported that the league was exploring ending its contract with Westwood One or sharing games with another network due to Westwood One's financial problems. The Sports USA Radio Network, ESPN Radio and Sporting News Radio were mentioned as possible partners; Fox Sports Radio was notably excluded from consideration. Sports USA currently carries Sunday afternoon games by agreement with individual teams, while ESPN carries the NBA and Major League Baseball, the latter causing a potential schedule conflict between Sunday Night Football and Sunday Night Baseball, plus the MLB Playoffs. Sunday night, Monday night, Thanksgiving and all other Thursday and Saturday games are covered by the contract. Of the offers, Westwood One was the high bidder (and reportedly the only one offering guaranteed money), ESPN requested a longer-term deal, the Sporting News offered a revenue-sharing plan in lieu of rights fees, and Sports USA was described as a "long shot." After a restructuring shored up the company's financial situation, Westwood One in March 2009 earned a two-year extension for all of the night games, paying US$33,000,000 for the two-year deal.

In addition to the official feature game package, three networks will carry nationwide radio broadcasts of Sunday afternoon games. The newest such network is Compass Media Networks, which has signed deals with eight teams. Sports USA and Westwood One will carry games from the other 24 teams. Dial Global, which previously backed Sports USA's coverage in 2008, will instead handle Compass's package for 2009.

References

External links
 
 Schedule of American Football League Legacy Games
 ESPN.com article on AFL Legacy Games
USA TODAY series on the American Football League
Sports Illustrated ~ "Where are They Now" ~ American Football League
NFL.com article "Celebrating the 50th Anniversary of the American Football League"
2009 NFL season at ESPN
2009 NFL season at Pro-Football Reference
2009 NFL season at Sports Illustrated
2009 NFL season at NFL.com
Football Outsiders 2009 Statistical Year in Review

 
National Football League
National Football League seasons
NFL